The Bustros family is a prominent Lebanese Antiochian Greek Orthodox  family. One of the “Seven Families”, it is one of the original Beirut families along with the descendants of Sursock, Fernaine, Dagher, Trad, Tueni and Gebeily families, who constituted the traditional high society of Beirut.  Estate holders and feudal lords by origin, today they are business owners, artists and land owners throughout the country.

The surname Bustros is believed to spring out of another name of Greek origin, Silvestros, meaning the Savior.  Coming from Greece in the 1620-1630 period, a Silvestros Bishop landed in Enfeh, in north Lebanon, then settled in the old city of Beirut.  The actual name is sometimes preceded with the French article "de" meaning "of the house of"; although its use is diminishing today amongst members of the family.

Several members of the Bustros Family were among the founders of Spartali & Co, an important 19th century export-import company which is active up to the present.

"Palais Bustros", or the Bustros Palace, originally one of the residences of the Fadlallah branch, is today one of the historical landmarks of Beirut. The palace houses the Ministry of Foreign Affairs and Emigrants. The palace of Nicolas Bustros, a 1930s landmark, was demolished during the civil war (1975/1990). A third palace belonging to the Abdallah branch, has been turned into a Fitness Club.

"Rue Selim Bustros" or Bustros Street in the Achrafieh district of Beirut is one of the commercial and business hubs of the Lebanese capital.
"Rue Michel Bustros" is another street in the Achrafieh district which is commonly referred to as " Talaat Accaoui "

Beirut: The Last Home Movie is a documentary by Jennifer Fox and Gaby Bustros that peeks into the struggles that members of the Bustros family faced living in Beirut during the Lebanese civil war.

Some Prominent Members of the Bustros family

Dany Bustros, bellydancer, socialite and stage actress 
Archbishop Cyril Salim Bustros, eparch of the Melkite Greek Catholic Church in Beirut and Byblos.
Michel Sassine, Son of Laurice Bustros, prominent Lebanese politician 
Evelyn Bustros activist for women's rights and social reformer; former president of the Lebanese Council of Women 
Mouna Boustros: a main character in Beirut, the Last Home Movie. Mouna Boustros died on August 6, 1989 after a shell hit the house she had refused to leave and vowed to either protect or die in.
Nicolas Michel Bustros owner of the Palais Bustros father of Miche Bustros who used to be the chief of protocol in Beirut for years
Sabine Bustros journalist, activist and member of the board of Chateau Kefraya

References

Lebanese families
Lebanese Melkite Greek Catholics
Members of the Greek Orthodox Church of Antioch